Hythe railway station in Essex is on the Sunshine Coast Line, a branch of the Great Eastern Main Line in the East of England, serving Hythe and other eastern areas of Colchester. It is  down the line from London Liverpool Street. Its three-letter station code is HYH.

The station was opened in 1847 by the Colchester, Stour Valley, Sudbury & Halstead Railway, then part of the Eastern Union Railway, initially for goods only and then in 1863 for passenger services. It is currently managed by Abellio Greater Anglia, which also operates all trains serving the station.

To the west of the station is a triangle of lines, with three junctions. The lines lead to either  or  stations; the junctions are known as Hythe Junction, East Gates Junction (at the northern extremity of the triangle) and Colne Junction (at the western extremity).

History
A line to Hythe Quay was opened on 1 April 1847 by the Colchester, Stour Valley, Sudbury & Halstead Railway, which was worked by the Eastern Union Railway (EUR) and was a freight-only line.

There are still sidings present at Hythe but they are no longer in use, and there was once a short branch to Hythe quay which crossed the River Colne adjacent to the station by a small iron bridge. There is no evidence today of the former quayside tracks, but aerial photograph sites clearly show the exact alignments.

There was also a spur from the station to Colchester Gas Works, which ran along the street to Hythe quay. This became redundant in 1973 when the United Kingdom switched from town gas to natural gas. Little trace now remains of this, except a small section of trackbed at Hythe, and the piers of the bridge (removed around 2007) over the River Colne.

Hythe station underwent major renovation in 2008 and 2009, including the extension of the platforms to accommodate 12-coach train sets, the demolition of the original station building, and the dismantling of the disused coal depot. The north siding was also removed, as was the pointwork and a short section of track leading to the south sidings. The station building remained until its demolition in June 2009 but had not been used for many years. Consequently, it had been subjected to vandalism.

The rebuilt station has a bright image and modern facilities incorporating a ticket-machine on the northbound platform 1. It also now accommodates longer trains to and from London Liverpool Street during peak times with no need to change at Colchester.
 
The station also has car-parking facilities providing short- and long-term parking for commuters and the wider public; these are adjacent to the London-bound platform with easy access to the station. Other facilities include a café and car-wash.

Services
The following services typically call at Hythe:

Additional services between London Liverpool Street and  call during peak hours. These services also call at the station on Sundays. They are typically formed of  trains.

References

External links

1849 establishments in England
Railway stations in Essex
DfT Category F2 stations
Former Great Eastern Railway stations
Railway stations in Great Britain opened in 1863
Greater Anglia franchise railway stations
Buildings and structures in Colchester (town)
Transport in Colchester